This is a list of states and union territories of India ranked according to crime against women and rate of crime against women. The list is compiled from the 2016 and 2018 Crime in India Report published by National Crime Records Bureau (NCRB), Government of India.

As of 2016, Delhi is the least safe State/UT with the highest cognizable crime rate of 160.4 (per 100,000 persons). Nagaland has the lowest incidence of crime based on the percentage of share.

India ranks 148 out of 170 countries in the 'Women, Peace And Security Index 2021'.

List 

Notes:

References

States and union territories of India-related lists
Lists of subdivisions of India